The Konya Subregion (Turkish: Konya Alt Bölgesi) (TR52) is a statistical subregion in Turkey.

Provinces 

 Konya Province (TR521)
 Karaman Province (TR522)

See also 

 NUTS of Turkey

External links 
 TURKSTAT

Sources 
 ESPON Database

Statistical subregions of Turkey